Alone may refer to:

 Solitude, a state of seclusion or isolation
 Loneliness, negative emotions arising from seclusion

Film and television

Film
 Alone (1931 French film), by Henri Diamant-Berger
 Alone (1931 Soviet film), by Leonid Trauberg and Grigori Kozintsev
 Alone, a 1991 short film featuring Paul Ben-Victor
 Alone, a 1997 American television film starring Ed Begley Jr.
 Alone (2001 film), a Croatian film by Lukas Nola
 Alone (2004 film), a German film
 Alone, a 2004 short film by Gregory Orr
 Alone (2007 film), a Thai horror film by Banjong Pisanthanakun and Parkpoom Wongpoom
 Alone (2008 film), a Turkish film by Çağan Irmak
 Alone (2013 film) or Phobia, an American horror film
 Alone. (2014 film), an American documentary film
 Alone (2015 Hindi film), an Indian horror film by Bhushan Patel
 Alone (2015 Kannada film), an Indian action film by JKS
 Alone (2015 Peruvian film), a Peruvian road comedy-drama film by Joanna Lombardi
 Alone (2020 horror film), an American film by Johnny Martin
 Alone (2020 thriller film), an American film by John Hyams
 Alone (2023 film), an Indian Malayalam-language film by Shaji Kailas

Television
 Alone (TV series), a 2015 American reality game show
 "Alone" (American Crime Story), a 2018 episode
 "Alone" (Black Summer), a 2019 episode
 "Alone" (House), a 2007 episode
 "Alone" (The Walking Dead), a 2014 episode
 "Alone" (The X-Files), a 2001 episode

Literature
 Alone (novella), a 1903 novella by August Strindberg
 "Alone" (poem), an 1829 poem by Edgar Allan Poe
 Alone: A Love Story, a 2020 book and podcast (since 2017) by Michelle Parise
 Alone, a 1921 travel book by Norman Douglas
 Alone, a 1938 memoir by Richard Evelyn Byrd

Music

Albums
 Alone (Bill Evans album), 1970
 Alone (Again), by Bill Evans, 1977
 Alone (Chet Atkins album), 1973
 Alone (Eleanor McEvoy album), 2011
 Alone (Evan Brewer album), 2011
 Alone (Judy Garland album), 1957
 Alone (Modern Talking album), 1999
 Alone (The Morning After Girls album) or the title song, 2011
 Alone (The Pretenders album) or the title song, 2016
 Alone (Solitude Aeturnus album), 2006
 Alone (Vern Gosdin album) or the title song, 1989
 Alone: Ballads for Solo Piano, by André Previn, 2007
 Alone: The Home Recordings of Rivers Cuomo, 2007
 Alone (EP), by Sistar, or the title song, 2012

Songs
 "Alone" (1935 song), performed by Allan Jones and Kitty Carlisle in the Marx Brothers film A Night at the Opera
 "Alone" (Alan Walker song), 2016
  "Alone" (Armin van Buuren song), 2014
 "Alone" (B'z song), 1991
 "Alone" (Bee Gees song), 1997
 "Alone" (Big Country song), 1993
 "Alone" (Chisato Moritaka song), 1988
 "Alone" (E.M.D. song), 2008
 "Alone" (Falling in Reverse song), 2013
 "Alone" (Halsey song), 2018
 "Alone" (i-Ten song), 1983; covered by Heart (1987) and Celine Dion (2008)
 "Alone" (Jessie Ware song), 2017
 "Alone" (Lasgo song), 2001
 "Alone" (Lay song), 2015
 "Alone" (Marshmello song), 2016
 "Alone" (Rod Wave song), 2022
 "Alone" (Selah Sue song), 2014
 "Alone (Why Must I Be Alone)", by the Shepherd Sisters, 1957; covered by the Four Seasons (1964)
 "Alone", by Alexandra Stan from Alesta, 2016
 "Alone", by Amorphis from Am Universum, 2001
 "Alone", by Anathema from The Silent Enigma, 1995
 "Alone", by Arcturus from La Masquerade Infernale, 1997
 "Alone", by Avril Lavigne, the B-side of "Girlfriend", 2007
 "Alone", by Babylon, 2021
 "Alone", by Band-Maid from Brand New Maid, 2016
 "Alone", by Bazzi, 2016
 "Alone", by the Beautiful South from Blue Is the Colour, 1996
 "Alone", by Ben Harper from Burn to Shine, 1999
 "Alone", by Blink-182; see List of songs recorded by Blink-182, 1983
 "Alone", by Buckcherry from Music from and Inspired by Mission: Impossible 2, 2000
 "Alone", by Bullet for My Valentine from Fever, 2010
 "Alone", by Carly Simon from Carly Simon, 1971
 "Alone", by Current 93 from Imperium, 1997
 "Alone", by Cyrus Villanueva, 2017
 "Alone", by Dami Im from My Reality, 2021
 "Alone", by the Damned from Music for Pleasure, 1977
 "Alone", by Dan Black from UN, 2001
 "Alone", by Dark Tranquillity from Skydancer, 1993
 "Alone", by Dinosaur Jr. from Hand It Over, 1997
 "Alone", by Doja Cat from Planet Her, 2021
 "Alone", by the Gathering from Home, 2006
 "Alone", by the God Machine from One Last Laugh in a Place of Dying, 1994
 "Alone", by I Prevail from Lifelines, 2016
 "Alone", by Jolin Tsai from Agent J, 2007
 "Alone", by Judas Priest from Nostradamus, 2008
 "Alone", by Kelly Clarkson from Stronger, 2011
 "Alone", by Love Amongst Ruin from Love Amongst Ruin, 2010
 "Alone", by Mikuni Shimokawa, 2000
 "Alone?", by Nightingale from The Breathing Shadow, 1995
 "Alone", by Orchestral Manoeuvres in the Dark, B-side of "If You Want It", 2010
 "Alone", by Parkway Drive from Deep Blue, 2010
 "Alone", by Pearl Jam from Ten, 1991
 "Alone", by the Prom Kings from The Prom Kings, 2005
 "Alone", by Rag'n'Bone Man from Life by Misadventure, 2021
 "Alone", by Sanctus Real from Fight the Tide, 2004
 "Alone", by Sara Evans from Stronger, 2011
 "Alone", by Sleeping with Sirens from Feel, 2013
 "Alone", by the Spencer Davis Group from Gluggo, 1973
 "Alone", by Stars from There Is No Love in Fluorescent Light, 2017
 "Alone", by Suicidal Tendencies from Lights...Camera...Revolution!, 1990
 "Alone", by Tech N9ne from Boiling Point, 2012
 "Alone", by Toby Lightman from Bird on a Wire, 2006
 "Alone", by Toto from 40 Trips Around the Sun, 2018
 "Alone", by Trevor Daniel, 2021
 "Alone", by Trey Songz from Passion, Pain & Pleasure, 2010
 "Alone", by Zebrahead from MFZB, 2003

Places
 Alavana, or Alone, an Ancient Roman settlement at Watercrook
 Alone, Kentucky, US, an unincorporated townsite

Other uses
 ALONE, a charity providing support for elderly people in Ireland
 Alone (radio series), a 2017 BBC Radio 4 series
 Alone (Saint Seiya: The Lost Canvas), a fictional character in the manga/anime Saint Seiya: The Lost Canvas
 Alone (writer), Hernán Díaz Arrieta (1891–1984), Chilean literary critic
 Amarna letter EA 282, or "Alone", a 14th-century BC clay tablet at the British Museum

See also
 Alona (disambiguation)
 Alauna (disambiguation)
 Solo (disambiguation)
 Single (disambiguation)